Hohlbach is a small river of Hesse, Germany. It flows into the Nidda near Schotten.

See also
List of rivers of Hesse

Rivers of Hesse
Rivers of the Vogelsberg
Rivers of Germany